Sherwin Eric James (born 6 June 1978 in Saint Patrick Parish, Dominica) is a retired track and field Olympic athlete who represented Dominica.

He competed at the  2000 Summer Olympics in the men's 200 metres where he finished eighth in his heat so failing to advance, he also competed at the 1999 World Championships in Athletics and 2001 World Championships in Athletics.

References

Living people
1978 births
Dominica male sprinters
Olympic athletes of Dominica
Athletes (track and field) at the 2000 Summer Olympics
Commonwealth Games competitors for Dominica
Athletes (track and field) at the 2002 Commonwealth Games